One Life and Two Trails is a 1997 Venezuelan drama film directed by Alberto Arvelo. The film was selected as the Venezuelan entry for the Best Foreign Language Film at the 70th Academy Awards, but was not accepted as a nominee.

Cast
 Germán Mendieta as Romer del Gado
 Ramona Pérez as Ninfa del Gado

Plot
Romer (German Mendieta) is a successful architect in Caracas as the story opens. It has presumably been years since he visited his mother, Ninfa (Ramona Perez), in the Andean section of the country. When he receives an old family photo in the mail, he becomes consumed with the disquieting sense of her imminent death. As he travels back to his birthplace, Romer’s story unfolds. A bright youngster, he’s selected to attend a seminary and possibly enter the priesthood. Instead, he winds up in the streets of Merida, first selling produce and later as part of a band of touring players. In Caracas, he lands a job washing dishes until the opportunity arises to teach school in a remote farming community.

See also
 List of submissions to the 70th Academy Awards for Best Foreign Language Film
 List of Venezuelan submissions for the Academy Award for Best Foreign Language Film

References

External links
 

1997 films
1997 drama films
Venezuelan drama films
1990s Spanish-language films